The Custodial Institutions Agency (DJI) is responsible for the incarceration of adults in the Netherlands. It is subordinate to the Ministry of Public Safety and Justice. The agency has its headquarters in The Hague.

The agency's sole institution in the Caribbean Netherlands is the JI Caribisch Nederland in Kralendijk, Bonaire.

References

External links

  

Prison and correctional agencies
Government agencies of the Netherlands